

The Adventures of Jimmy Neutron: Boy Genius: Attack of the Twonkies is a 2004 video game published by THQ. The game is based on the American animated series The Adventures of Jimmy Neutron, Boy Genius, specifically the episode of the same name. The game was developed by THQ Studio Australia for the GameCube and PlayStation 2. A Game Boy Advance version was developed by Tantalus.

Summary

In the game, the player controls Jimmy in a quest to save Earth from the alien "Twonkies" using gadgets and inventions. Although made after the Jimmy Neutron episode, "Attack of the Twonkies!", levels are designed with the same mechanics as the film, including a rocket and the theme park "Retroland".

Reception

The game has received "mixed or average" reviews from critics, as GameRankings gave it a score of 52.57% for the Game Boy Advance version, 63.50% for the Nintendo GameCube version, and 69.40% for the PlayStation 2 version; while Metacritic gave it a score of 56 out of 100 for the GBA version and 65 out of 100 for both the GameCube and PS2 versions.

References

External links
 
 

2004 video games
Game Boy Advance games
GameCube games
3D platform games
Open-world video games
PlayStation 2 games
Attack of the Twonkies
Video games developed in Australia
THQ games
RenderWare games
Tantalus Media games
Single-player video games